Lawn Hill is an outback locality split between the Shire of Burke and the City of Mount Isa in Queensland, Australia. The locality is on the Queensland border with the Northern Territory. In the  Lawn Hill had a population of 19 people.

Geography 
The locality is bounded to the west by the Northern Territory.

Lawn Hill has the following ranges:

 Constance Range
 Edith Range (

 Littles Range
 Smiths Range

and mountains:

 Fort William 
 Mount Caroline 
 Mount Oscar 
 Mount Steiglitz 
 Napoleon Bonnet 
 Point Watson 

 Mount Kay 
 Verdon Rock 

It also has plains:

 Burenda Plain
 Rankins Plain 

 Wangunda Plain()
Mended Hill is a neighbourhood.

Pitchfork Camp is a neighbourhood.

A large part of the locality from the west through to the south is within the Boodjamulla National Park and the associated Lawn Hill Resources Reserves.

History 
Waanyi (also known as Wanyi, Wanyee, Wanee, Waangyee, Wonyee, Garawa, and Wanji) is an Australian Aboriginal language of the Gulf Country. The language region includes the western parts of Lawn Hill Creek and Nicholson River, from about the boundary between the Northern Territory and Queensland, westwards towards Alexandria station, Doomadgee, and Nicholson River. It includes the local government area of the Aboriginal Shire of Doomadgee.

Yulluna (also known as Yalarnga, Yalarrnga, Jalanga, Jalannga, Wonganja, Gunggalida, and Jokula) is an Australian Aboriginal language. The Yulluna language region includes the local government boundaries of the Shire of Cloncurry and other areas near the Gulf of Carpentaria.

Smiths Range was named by explorer William Landsborough on 28 November 1861 during his expedition searching for Burke and Wills.

The locality is named after the Boodjamulla National Park, which was previously known as the Lawn Hill National Park, which was in turn named after Lawn Hill Station, a pastoral property.

Lawn Hill Gorge was previously part of Lawn Hill pastoral station. Lawn Hill National Park was established to protect the gorge in December 1984. The national park was expanded in March 1992 to include Riversleigh World Heritage Area (formerly part of Riversleigh pastoral station).

Economy 
There are a number of homesteads in the locality, including:

 Adels Grove
 Lawn Hill

 Old Herbert Vale
 Riversleigh

Amenities 
Regular services by the Uniting Church in Australia are held at the campfire at Adels Grove. These are provided by the McKay Patrol, an aerial service of the Uniting Church in Australia that operates out of Cloncurry.

Attractions 
Boodjamulla National Park is a popular attraction with spectacular gorges, sandstone ranges and fossils. Lawn Hill Creek has created Lawn Hill Gorge which is filled with freshwater from springs from the limestone plateau to the west. The gorge is an oasis of water and lush vegetation which attracts the wildlife and is surrounded by sandstone cliffs.

The Riversleigh World Heritage Area is within the south-east of the national park. It contains fossils from the late Oligocene period, dating back 25 million years. Its world heritage listing reflects that it is one of the most significant fossil deposits in the world, particularly for mammal fossils from Gondwana prior to its separation from other land masses. Fossils found there include crocodiles, lizards, turtles, pythons, fish, snails, and birds.

See also
 Frank Hann

References

Shire of Burke
City of Mount Isa
Localities in Queensland